Grant McConachie Way is a three-to-six lane expressway in Richmond and Vancouver, British Columbia, Canada. Named for aviator Grant McConachie, it is the primary access road into Vancouver International Airport on Sea Island. It is also one of the three roads entering Vancouver from the south, along with Knight Street and Oak Street. Upon entering Vancouver, the road becomes Southwest Marine Drive.

The road crosses the Arthur Laing Bridge over the North Arm Fraser River. Its east-west alignment on Sea Island between the Arthur Laing Bridge and the airport is closely paralleled by SkyTrain's Canada Line.

Major intersections

References

British Columbia provincial highways
Streets in Vancouver
Transport in Richmond, British Columbia
Sea Island (British Columbia)